Baz Qaleh may refer to:
 Baz Qaleh-ye Akbar
 Baz Qaleh-ye Malek